Ledyard R. Tucker (19 September 1910 – 16 August 2004) was an American mathematician who specialized in statistics and psychometrics. His Ph.D. advisor at the University of Chicago was Louis Leon Thurstone. He was a lecturer in psychology at Princeton University from 1948 to 1960, while simultaneously working at ETS. In 1960, he moved to working full-time in academia when he joined the University of Illinois. The rest of his career was spent as professor of quantitative psychology and educational psychology at UIUC until he retired in 1979. Tucker is best known for his Tucker decomposition and Tucker–Koopman–Linn model. He is credited with the invention of Angoff method.

In 1957 he was elected as a Fellow of the American Statistical Association.

He died at his home in Savoy, Illinois, on August 16, 2004, aged 93.

Selected publications

References

A Conversation with Ledyard R Tucker by Neil J. Dorans
Remembering Ledyard R Tucker by Tom Stewart

1910 births
2004 deaths
University of Colorado alumni
University of Chicago alumni
Intelligence researchers
20th-century American mathematicians
21st-century American mathematicians
American statisticians
People from Glenwood Springs, Colorado
Fellows of the American Statistical Association
People from Savoy, Illinois
Mathematicians from Colorado
Mathematicians from Illinois